was a designer of ukiyo-e Japanese woodblock prints in the late 18th and early 19th centuries.  He was originally a pupil of Tsutsumi Tōrin a painter of the Kanō school, but left the school and became an independent ukiyo-e artist.  Sekkyō is best known for his landscapes and bird-and-animal studies, the latter often printed entirely in black or blue ink (aizuri-e).

Gallery

References
 Lane, Richard. (1978).  Images from the Floating World, The Japanese Print. Oxford: Oxford University Press. ;  OCLC 5246796
 Newland, Amy Reigle. (2005). Hotei Encyclopedia of Japanese Woodblock Prints.  Amsterdam: Hotei. ;  OCLC 61666175 
 Roberts, Laurance P. (1976). A Dictionary of Japanese Artists. New York: Weatherhill. ;  OCLC 2005932 
 Stewart, Basil, A Guide to Japanese Prints and Their Subject Matter, New York, Dover Publications, 1979, 359.

Ukiyo-e artists